Marc López and David Marrero were the defending champions. They reached the final, where they lost to Eric Butorac and Jean-Julien Rojer 3–6, 4–6.

Seeds

Draw

Draw

References
 Main Draw

Men's Doubles